Ericomyrtus parviflora is a shrub endemic to Western Australia.

It is found in the South West, Great Southern, Wheatbelt and Goldfields-Esperance regions of Western Australia between York, Bridgetown and Jerramungup.

References

Eudicots of Western Australia
parviflora
Endemic flora of Western Australia
Plants described in 2015
Taxa named by Barbara Lynette Rye